Gasterosiphon deimatis is a species of sea snail, a marine gastropod mollusk in the family Eulimidae. This is the only species known to exist within the genus, Gasterosiphon.

References

External links
 To World Register of Marine Species

Eulimidae
Gastropods described in 1903